United Nations Security Council resolution 548, adopted unanimously on 24 February 1984, after examining the application of Brunei Darussalam for membership in the United Nations, the Council recommended to the General Assembly that Brunei Darussalam be admitted.

See also
 Member states of the United Nations
 List of United Nations Security Council Resolutions 501 to 600 (1982–1987)

References
Text of the Resolution at undocs.org

External links
 

 0548
 0548
 0548
February 1984 events
1984 in Brunei